rPath, Inc. was a technology company based in Raleigh, North Carolina, that developed technology to automate the process of constructing (or packaging), deploying and updating software.  rPath modeled and managed components and dependencies under version control. It acted as a model-driven and version-controlled repository and software distribution hub.

In November, 2012, rPath was acquired by SAS Institute.
Shortly after this,  rPath Linux was discontinued.

History 

rPath was founded in April 2005, and was originally known for packaging applications as virtual appliances for its independent software vendors (ISVs) and end-user customers. It was co-founded by Erik Troan, co-author of Red Hat Package Manager (RPM), a popular Linux package management system. Troan had left Red Hat in 2004 to found a company called Specifix. The first CEO was Bill Marshall.
Original investors were North Bridge Venture Partners and General Catalyst Partners, with $6.4 million in funding disclosed in September 2005.
A $9.1 million investment in February 2007 including new investor Wakefield Group was disclosed.
A $10 million investment was disclosed on June 24, 2008. A $7 million investment was disclosed in October, 2010.
The company headquarters were in Raleigh, North Carolina.

rPath was one of the first to market a software appliance. In 2009, rPath made a transition to selling to enterprise IT organizations. IT automation was seen as the codification of runbooks by some, but rPath industrialized the operational aspects of the data center by modelling software configurations.
rPath provided a commercial version control platform for deployed software systems. rPath was not a source code management system. Rather, it was an operational management system that applies the principles and disciplines of source code control to the management of deployable software systems—specifically, system manifests, packages, binaries, policies and system configurations. Version control aids systems to be quickly reproduced, patched and updated, rollback-ed and reported on.

rPath provided a deeply modelled system inventory. This inventory granularly describes the desired state of every file, binary, application component, and software stack on every production system—with complete information about applied policies and dependencies—as version-controlled system manifests. These manifests are actionable models for managing the complete lifecycle of deployed systems, providing the basis for understanding change impact and controlling change. Also, rather than applying universal updates, patches and updates can be targeted to only the systems that require change.

rPath allows definition of systems as layered variants of common base platforms. For example, the standard corporate web server stack may start with a standard build of Red Hat Enterprise Linux (RHEL), but add a specific custom version of the Apache HTTP Server and remove all availability of FTP. With this feature, 
rPath enabled IT groups to define and automatically enforce build-time policies that govern how systems are constructed.

When rPath imports new or existing software artefacts into system version control, it automatically analyzes each software artifact to discover its entire software supply chain, including operating system (OS) components, middleware and libraries. This information enables build-time system construction and validation and reduces the number of maintenance failures and outages that result from missing dependencies and conflicting components. "Ovum considers the automated dependency-checking capability to be an extremely useful and often overlooked feature that all such tools should employ."  
rPath ensured a consistent system definition, eliminating the risk of system "drift" between lifecycle stages and enabling a clean software build environment.

rPath developed Conary, an open source software package management and configuration software that formed the core of rBuilder. It allows rollbacks, incremental ("changeset") updates, and distributed downloading which removes the need for programs such as apt or yum.

rPath supported Microsoft Windows Server 2008 and 2003 as well as Red Hat Enterprise Linux 4 and 5, SUSE Linux Enterprise Server 10, and CentOS. It was also marketed as software as a service.

The NRE Alliance was a coalition of newScale, rPath and Eucalyptus Systems to promote private and hybrid cloud computing. The coalition was announced on August 24, 2010. It had a web site through August 2012.

On November 30, 2012, the business analytics company SAS Institute announced that it acquired key rPath assets, including technology and staff.

References

External links
rPath, Inc.

Cloud computing providers
Companies based in Raleigh, North Carolina
Companies established in 2005
Software appliances
Unix software